The Armstrong Siddeley ASA.1 Adder was an early British turbojet engine developed by the Armstrong Siddeley company and first run in November 1948.

Design and development
The Adder, a turbojet derivative of the Armstrong Siddeley Mamba, was originally developed as an expendable engine to power the Jindivik 1 target drone. The engine was then developed into a longer-life engine before evolving into the more-powerful Armstrong Siddeley Viper.

The ASA.1 Adder was flight tested in the rear-turret position of the Avro Lancaster III SW342, the aircraft also having been previously modified and used for icing trials of the Mamba by Armstrong Siddeley's Flight Test Department at Bitteswell.

Applications
GAF Pika
Saab 210

Specifications

See also

References

Further reading

External links

 Minijets website
 "Adder" a 1951 Flight article

Adder
1940s turbojet engines